The 2007 EHF Women's Champions Trophy was the 12th edition of the EHF Super Cup in new format. It started on 22 September 2007.

The event was organised at the Sala Sporturilor Traian by the 2006–07 Cup Winners’ Cup winner, Oltchim Râmnicu Vâlcea.

In front of sold out crowd, Oltchim Râmnicu Vâlcea won the title for the first time in their history after defeating in the final Zvezda Zvenigorod, the winners of the 2006–07 Women's EHF Cup and the eventual winners of the 2007–08 EHF Champions League. Slagelse Dream Team, the winners of the 2006–07 EHF Champions League, won the fight for third place.

Knockout stage

Bracket

Awards and statistics 
MVP:  (Zvezda Zvenigorod)
Best goalkeeper:  (Oltchim Râmnicu Vâlcea)

References

EHF Women's Champions Trophy
2007 in European sport 
Eur